Queen of the Moulin Rouge is a 1922 American silent drama film directed by Ray C. Smallwood and starring Martha Mansfield, Joseph Striker, and Jane Thomas.

Plot
As described in a film magazine review, Tom Richards is a budding violinist in Paris, but his teacher believes he lacks the soul to ever become really great. He thinks if he suffers he will arrive so he arranges a scheme with the young woman Tom loves. She takes a position as a cabaret dancer and he finds her there. He is torn with anguish and he seeks expression in playing his violin. He plays then as he has never played before and the teacher then reveals the plot and the two are reunited.

Cast

References

Bibliography
 Munden, Kenneth White. The American Film Institute Catalog of Motion Pictures Produced in the United States, Part 1. University of California Press, 1997.

External links

 

1922 films
1922 drama films
1920s English-language films
American silent feature films
Silent American drama films
American black-and-white films
Films directed by Ray C. Smallwood
Films set in Paris
1920s American films